is J-pop artist Mayumi Iizuka's first album, and it has the title song.

Exposition 
 This is the first music album and original work as a singer of Mayumi Iizuka, because it was released earlier than her first single.
 The first released CDs contains an additional little box-style package and postcards. After the second press, a picture on back side of the box package and the postcards are not available.
 "SALAD DAYS" (#2) and "Aoi Yugure" (#9) are lyrics by Mayumi Iizuka.
 The title song "Kataomoi" (#4) was used for the theme music of an anime, Tenchi in Tokyo (1997).) was used in a radio program for which she served as a radio personality.

Track listing 
 Kampekina Smile (完ペキなスマイル / Perfect Smile)
 Lyrics, Composition and Arrangement: Tomoki Hasegawa
 SALAD DAYS
 Lyrics: Mayumi Iizuka
 Composition: Mari Konishi
 Arrangement: Tomoki Hasegawa
 Tenshi no Paradise (天使のパラダイス / Angel's Paradise)
 Lyrics: Erina Nakajima
 Composition and Arrangement: Mitsukuni Murakami
 Kataomoi (かたおもい / The Unrequited Love)
 Lyrics and Composition: Miki Otsu
 Arrangement: Tomoki Hasegawa
 Romantic dane (ロマンチックだね / What a Romantic)
 Lyrics: Ayumi Murou
 Composition and Arrangement: Tomoki Hasegawa
 Shoshu (初秋 / The Early Autumn)
 Lyrics and Composition: Ritsuko Okazaki
 Arrangement: Tomoki Hasegawa
 Itai no Tondeke (いたいのとんでけ / Make It Go Away)
 Lyrics: Beans Mameda
 Composition: Miki Otsu
 Arrangement: Tomoki Hasegawa
 Kuchibue de Lu La La (口笛でル・ラ・ラ / Whistle Lu La La)
 Lyrics and Composition: Ritsuko Okazaki
 Arrangement: Tomoki Hasegawa
 Aoi Yugure (青い夕暮れ / Blue Twilight)
 Lyrics: Mayumi Iizuka
 Composition:Yasuya Kaira
 Arrangement: Tomoki Hasegawa
 Blue no Story (ブルーのストーリー / Blue Story)
 Lyrics: Miki Otsu
 Composition and Arrangement: Tomoki Hasegawa

References 

1997 albums
Mayumi Iizuka albums